Rodae (officially RODAE Automobile Craiova S.A., and later Daewoo Automobile Romania S.A.) was a joint venture between S.C. Automobile Craiova S.A. and Daewoo Heavy Industries that started in 1994.

History
In November 1994, Daewoo opened a production line in Romania, becoming the country's most important foreign investor, by establishing a joint venture, created by Automobile Craiova and the South Korean Daewoo group.

In 2006, Daewoo Automobile Craiova S.A. bought back 51% of the shares owned by the Korean company, which became 100% owned by the Romanian state.

In 2008, it was sold to Ford of Europe, a division of Ford Motor Company.

Models
 Rodae Club (1994–1996)
 Rodae Club 12 CS (1994–1995)
 Daewoo Cielo (1996–2007)
 Daewoo Espero (1996–2002)
 Daewoo Tico (1998–2002)
 Daewoo Leganza (1998–2002)
 Daewoo Nubira (1998–2008)
 Daewoo Matiz (1999–2008)
 Daewoo Tacuma (2002–2007)

References

External links

1994 establishments in Romania
2008 disestablishments in Romania
Joint ventures